Martin M. Malone (August 2, 1888 – January 30, 1962) was an American businessman and politician.

Malone was born in Montgomery, Le Sueur County, Minnesota and went to the Montgomery, Minnesota parochial and public schools. He lived in Montgomery, Minnesota with his wife and family. Malone was a warehouse worker and supervisor for the Green Giant Canning Company. Malone served on the Montgomery City Council and on the Montgomery City Park Board. He was  also the Montgomery Fire Department chief. Malone served in the Minnesota Senate from 1955 to 1958.

References

1888 deaths
1962 deaths
People from Le Sueur County, Minnesota
Businesspeople from Minnesota
Minnesota city council members
Minnesota state senators
American fire chiefs